The 2002 American Basketball Association All-Star Game was held at 19,500 seat Kemper Arena in Kansas City, Missouri on Sunday April 14, 2002, at 4:15 p.m. Kansas City Knights defeated ABA All-Stars, a team composed of league stars by 161-138 in front of their home crowd. ABA surprisingly chose the 2002 champions Kansas City Knights for the All-Star game instead of an East-West contest. The Knights had just won the 2nd ever ABA championship a month earlier. Maurice Carter of the Kansas City Knights won the MVP award

The Game
Kansas City Knights won the ABA All Star Game, beating the ABA All-stars by a great margin, 161-138, in front of 4,010 fans. 
Maurice Carter was unstoppable scoring 46 points, including 14 in the fourth quarter when the Knights pulled away. John Ford, a 6-foot-10 center and late-season addition for the Knights, had also an impressive performance, scoring 24 points.

All-Star Teams

Rosters

Kansas City Knights-
 Nick Bradford, G/F
 Maurice Carter, G
 John Ford, C
 Rick Hughes, F
 Pete Mickeal, F
 Ryan Sears, G
 Eric Taylor, F
 Maurice Trotter, G
 David Vanterpool, G/F
 Rex Walters, G
 Jason Williams, F Coach: Kevin Pritchard

See also
2005 ABA All-Star Game

References

External links
 game results

ABA All-Star Games
2001–02 in American basketball